Juan Gisbert Sr. and Manuel Orantes won the doubles tennis title at the 1975 Masters Grand Prix, which was played in a round-robin format.

Arthur Ashe and Stan Smith were the reigning champions from when the tournament was last held in 1970, but neither qualified this year.

Draw

''In three-teams-ties standings are determined by percentage of sets won, then percentage of games won.

References

Doubles